Windmill Hill is a village in the civil parish of Herstmonceux, in the Wealden district of East Sussex, England. In 2020 it had an estimated population of 585.

References 

Villages in East Sussex
Herstmonceux